Jules Louis Prevost (June 20, 1863 – September 2, 1937) was an American Episcopal missionary to Alaska, a linguist and translator, and a professor of the history of medicine at the Temple University School of Medicine.

Prevost studied at the Philadelphia Divinity School, receiving his B.D. degree in 1890. He was ordained to the diaconate by Bishop Ozi W. Whitaker. After ordination to the priesthood in 1891, he traveled to Fort Adams on the Yukon River in Alaska, arriving in August 1891.

He published the first newspaper in the Interior of Alaska, the Yukon Press, beginning on January 1, 1893. On furlough to the United States in 1894, he married Anna Louise Demonet and studied at the New York School of Pharmacy. They returned to Tanana. He translated portions of the Book of Common Prayer into the Upper Koyukon language, along with hymns and other texts.

Prevost served as US postmaster at Tanana. In 1906 he left Alaska permanently, returning with his family to Philadelphia. He served as rector of St. Ambrose's Church. He also earned a degree in medicine from Temple University School of Medicine, graduating in 1909.

He continued as a lecturer in medical history at Temple University until 1929. That year he accepted a call to St. Andrew's Church, Panama City, Florida. He died in Pughtown, Pennsylvania.

Jules' Magic Lantern

Jules' Magic Lantern Glass Slides
Glass Slides

Personal and family life
Jules L. Prevost married Anna Louise Demonet at St. John's Church (Episcopal), Brooklyn, Kings, New York on 18 December 1894.

Jules L. Prevost Life Summary documents:

Author of the Jules L. Prevost Summary files: Gary R. Prevost (Gary Prevost)

See the links below for the latest version; now available in English and French.

[Voir le lien pour la dernière version, maintenant disponible en anglais et en français.  La version française a été convertie de l'anglais à l'aide du traducteur MS Word. Certaines mises en forme et traductions peuvent différer de la version anglaise.  Tout le texte a été traduit automatiquement. Les figures graphiques avec l'anglais n'ont pas été incluses dans la traduction en français. You can use the Google English to French converter for those words in English: https://www.google.com/search?q=translate+english+to+french&rlz=1C1CHBF_enUS848US848&sxsrf=AJOqlzWXPrPFYqQ0ll1iHJz5_rmEOs-JQA%3A1675030760365&ei=6PDWY8L3FYuq5NoPzLGZmAc&oq=translate+english&gs_lcp =Cgxnd3Mtd2l6LXNlcnAQARgAMgQIIxAnMggIABCABBCxAzIICAAQgAQQsQMyBQgAEIAEMgUIABCABDIICAAQgAQQsQMyBQgAEIAEMgUIABCABDIFCAAQgAQyCAgAEIAEELEDOgoIABBHENYEELADOgcIABCwAxBDOgYIABAHEB5KBAhBGABKBAhGGABQ2hhY2hhglDFoAnABeACAAU2IAZIBkgEBMpgBAKABAcgBCsABAQ&sclient=gws-wiz-serp ]

SECOND EDITION (DEUXIÈME ÉDITION):

English Version (Version anglaise):

https://commons.wikimedia.org/wiki/File:Jules_Louis_Prevost_Life_Summary_219_ENGLISH.pdf

French Version (Version française):

https://commons.wikimedia.org/wiki/File:Jules_Louis_Prevost_Resume_de_la_vie_217_FRENCH.pdf

FIRST EDITION (PREMIÈRE ÉDITION):

See this file for a Comprehensive Chronological Time-Lined Summary of Jules L. Prevost:                https://commons.wikimedia.org/wiki/File:Jules_Louis_Prevost_Life_Summary_183_Final_First_Edition.pdf

References
 Obituary: Jules Louis Prevost, Journal of the American Medical Association, December 11, 1937
 The Spirit of Missions, May 1905, pp. 252–254.
 Hudson Stuck, "The Passing of a Veteran," in The Alaskan Churchman, Nov. 1906.

External links
 Service Book in the Dialect of the Qlīyukuwhūtana Indians: Portions of the Book of Common Prayer in Upper Koyukon (1908), translated by Prevost, digitized by Richard Mammana

1863 births
1937 deaths
19th-century American Episcopal priests
20th-century American Episcopal priests
People from Panama City, Florida
Clergy from Philadelphia
People from Tanana, Alaska
Alaska postmasters